Bryan Berry Helmer (born July 15, 1972) is a  Canadian former professional ice hockey player. He is currently the VP of Hockey Operations with the Hershey Bears of the American Hockey League (AHL). He previously served as an assistant coach with the Bears and the Peterborough Petes of the Ontario Hockey League (OHL). A veteran of over 1,000 AHL and IHL games, Helmer previously served as captain for the Hershey Bears in the American Hockey League (AHL). He has also played in the National Hockey League (NHL) with the Phoenix Coyotes, St. Louis Blues, Vancouver Canucks and the Washington Capitals.

Playing career
Helmer went undrafted but was signed as a free agent by the New Jersey Devils in 1994. He never played a game with the Devils, instead playing with their minor league affiliate Albany River Rats for 5 years. His most successful season with the River Rats was during the 1997–98 season when he scored 63 points in 80 games along with 101 PIM and an appearance in the AHL All-Star Game.

Following the 1997–98 season Helmer signed with the Phoenix Coyotes. He made his NHL debut with the Coyotes, appearing in 11 games. He was then released and later claimed on waivers by the St. Louis Blues. He appeared in another 29 games with the Blues, notching four assists. The 1999–2000 season saw Helmer play the majority of the year with the Worcester IceCats while also appearing in 15 games with the Blues. On February 12, 2000, Helmer scored his first career NHL goal against Guy Hebert and the Mighty Ducks of Anaheim in a 6-3 Blues victory

After the 1999–00 season, Helmer signed with the Vancouver Canucks. He spent the next three years bouncing between the Canucks and the minors. The 2001–02 season saw Helmer achieve NHL career highs with ten points and 53 PIM. In addition, Helmer played six games in the playoffs that year, the only time he played in the Stanley Cup Playoffs.

On July 25, 2003, Helmer was traded by the Canucks back to the Phoenix Coyotes for Martin Grenier. He missed the majority of the 2003–04 season due to a shoulder injury but managed to appear in 17 games with the Coyotes. Prior to the 2008–09 season, this had been the last time Helmer played in the NHL. He signed with the Detroit Red Wings in 2004 but played two years in the AHL with the Grand Rapids Griffins. He was re-signed by the Coyotes in 2006 and had been playing with the San Antonio Rampage.

Helmer signed with the Hershey Bears on July 24, 2008, and served as captain of the team. On November 28, 2008, the Washington Capitals signed and recalled Helmer from Hershey due to several key injuries among the Capitals' defensemen. Helmer led the Bears to Calder Cups in 2009 and 2010.

While with the Oklahoma City Barons, Helmer became the AHL all-time leading scorer among defencemen in 2011, passing John Slaney. Helmer has 564 points in 1116 AHL games.

After captaining the Barons in his second season with the club, Helmer was left unsigned through the beginning of the 2012–13 season, due to the NHL lockout. After an agreement was reached, Helmer was signed by the Springfield Falcons on January 9, 2013.

In 2017, he was inducted into the AHL Hall of Fame.

Career statistics

Regular season and playoffs

Awards
1997–98: AHL First All-Star Team
2005–06: AHL Second All-Star Team
2017 AHL Hall of Fame inductee

References

External links

1972 births
Living people
Albany River Rats players
Canadian ice hockey defencemen
Canadian people of German descent
Grand Rapids Griffins players
Hershey Bears players
Ice hockey people from Ontario
Kansas City Blades players
Las Vegas Thunder players
Manitoba Moose players
Oklahoma City Barons players
Phoenix Coyotes players
St. Louis Blues players
San Antonio Rampage players
Sportspeople from Sault Ste. Marie, Ontario
Springfield Falcons players
Undrafted National Hockey League players
Vancouver Canucks players
Washington Capitals players
Worcester IceCats players